Riyad El Alami (born 28 February 1998) is a professional footballer who plays as a defender.

Career statistics

Club

Notes

References

1998 births
Living people
People from Oujda
Finnish footballers
Moroccan footballers
Association football defenders
Kakkonen players
Kolmonen players
Veikkausliiga players
FC Espoo players
Reipas Lahti players
FC Lahti players
21st-century Finnish people